SimpsonHaugh (formerly Ian Simpson Architects) is an English architecture practice established in 1987 by Ian Simpson and Rachel Haugh. The practice has offices in London and Manchester. In 2014, the practice re-branded as Simpson Haugh & Partners.

Since the 1996 Manchester bombing by the IRA, Ian Simpson Architects have contributed to the reconstruction of Manchester. The firm has been appointed to design major new mixed-use schemes in Glasgow, Leicester and London's South Bank

Notable projects

Ongoing
4 Angel Square, Manchester (2018-2022)

Completed
Deansgate Square, Manchester (2016–21)
1 Blackfriars, London (2014–18)
River Street Tower, Manchester (2018-20)
Holbrook House London (2017–19)
City Village, Belgrade Plaza Coventry (2014–17)
1 Spinningfields, Manchester (2015–17)
Battersea Power Station Phase 1, London (2013–16)
Verde, Newcastle (2014–16)
First Street development, Manchester (2013–15)
The View, Newcastle (2006–15)
Manchester Central Library and Manchester Town Hall Extension restoration, Manchester (2010–14)
Beetham Tower, Manchester, England (2003–06)
Holloway Circus Tower, Birmingham, England (2006)
Shudehill Interchange, Manchester, England (2003)
Urbis, Manchester, England (1998–2002)
No. 1 Deansgate, Manchester, England (2002)
Parkway Gate, Manchester
Gallowgate, Newcastle
Merchants Warehouse restoration, Castlefield, Manchester (1993–97)

Awards
2021

The International Property Awards, Best Mixed Use Architecture London and UK: One Black Friars
2015

Newcastle Lord Mayor's Design Awards : The View – People's Choice and New Building categories at the bi-annual Newcastle Lord Mayor's Design Award.

2011

Newcastle Lord Mayor's Design Awards : Newcastle University Business School (NUBS) & Central Link, Downing Plaza – New Building Newcastle Lord Mayor's Design Award.

2009

RIBA International Design Competition Winner : The National Wildflower Centre

MSA Design Awards – Overall Winner: Parkway Gate, Manchester

2008
RIBA National Award Winner : Hilton Tower
Manchester Confidential – Best New Building : Parkway Gate

2007 
Council on Tall Buildings and Urban Habitat Best Tall Building – Award Winner : The Beetham Hilton Tower, Manchester
RIBA Award Winner : Manchester Transport Interchange

2004
RIBA Award Winner : The Manchester Museum, Manchester

2003 
RIBA Award Winner : No. 1 Deansgate, Manchester

2002
RIBA Housing Design Awards : Designer Ian Simpson Architects

References

External links
 SimpsonHaugh

Architecture firms of England
Companies based in Manchester
Design companies established in 1987
1987 establishments in England